Cumberland is an unincorporated community in Cumberland County, North Carolina, United States. The community is located between Fayetteville to the north and Hope Mills on North Carolina Highway 59; parts of the community have been annexed by the two cities. Cumberland has a post office with ZIP code 28331.

References

Unincorporated communities in Cumberland County, North Carolina
Unincorporated communities in North Carolina